Rudolf von Bitter Rucker (born March 22, 1946) is an American mathematician, computer scientist, science fiction author, and one of the founders of the cyberpunk literary movement. The author of both fiction and non-fiction, he is best known for the novels in the Ware Tetralogy, the first two of which (Software and Wetware) both won Philip K. Dick Awards. Until its closure in 2014 he edited the science fiction webzine Flurb.

Early life
Rucker was born and raised in Louisville, Kentucky, son of Embry Cobb Rucker Sr (October 1, 1914 - August 1, 1994), who ran a small furniture-manufacture company and later became an Episcopal priest and community activist, and Marianne (née von Bitter). The Rucker family were of Huguenot descent. Through his mother, he is a great-great-great-grandson of Georg Wilhelm Friedrich Hegel.

Rucker attended St. Xavier High School before earning a BA in mathematics from Swarthmore College (1967) and MS (1969) and PhD (1973) degrees in mathematics from Rutgers University.

Career
Rucker taught mathematics at the State University of New York at Geneseo from 1972 to 1978. Although he was liked by his students and "published a book [Geometry, Relativity and the Fourth Dimension] and several papers," several colleagues took umbrage at his long hair and convivial relationships with English and philosophy professors amid looming budget shortfalls; as a result, he failed to attain tenure in the "dysfunctional" department.

Thanks to a grant from the Alexander von Humboldt Foundation, Rucker taught at the Ruprecht Karl University of Heidelberg from 1978 to 1980. He then taught at Randolph-Macon Women's College in Lynchburg, Virginia from 1980 to 1982, before trying his hand as a full-time author for four years.

Inspired by an interview with Stephen Wolfram, Rucker became a computer science professor at San José State University in 1986, from which he retired as professor emeritus in 2004.

From 1988 to 1992 he was hired by John Walker of Autodesk as a programmer of cellular automata, which inspired his book The Hacker and the Ants.

A mathematician with philosophical interests, he has written The Fourth Dimension and Infinity and the Mind. Princeton University Press published new editions of Infinity and the Mind in 1995 and in 2005, both with new prefaces; the first edition is cited with fair frequency in academic literature.

As his "own alternative to cyberpunk," Rucker developed a writing style he terms transrealism. Transrealism, as outlined in his 1983 essay The Transrealist Manifesto, is science fiction based on the author's own life and immediate perceptions, mixed with fantastic elements that symbolize psychological change. Many of Rucker's novels and short stories apply these ideas. One example of Rucker's transreal works is Saucer Wisdom, a novel in which the main character is abducted by aliens. Rucker and his publisher marketed the book, tongue in cheek, as non-fiction.

His earliest transreal novel, White Light, was written during his time at Heidelberg. This transreal novel is based on his experiences at SUNY Geneseo.

Rucker often uses his novels to explore scientific or mathematical ideas; White Light examines the concept of infinity, while the Ware Tetralogy (written from 1982 through 2000) is in part an explanation of the use of natural selection to develop software (a subject also developed in his The Hacker and the Ants, written in 1994). His novels also put forward a mystical philosophy that Rucker has summarized in an essay titled, with only a bit of irony, "The Central Teachings of Mysticism" (included in Seek!, 1999).

His non-fiction book, The Lifebox, the Seashell, and the Soul: What Gnarly Computation Taught Me About Ultimate Reality, the Meaning Of Life, and How To Be Happy summarizes the various philosophies he's believed over the years and ends with the tentative conclusion that we might profitably view the world as made of computations, with the final remark, "perhaps this universe is perfect."

Personal life
Rucker was the roommate of Kenneth Turan during his freshman year at Swarthmore College. In 1967, Rucker married Sylvia Bogsch Rucker (1943-2023). Together they have three children. On July 1, 2008, Rucker suffered a cerebral hemorrhage. Thinking he may not be around much longer, this prompted him to write Nested Scrolls, his autobiography.

Rucker resided in Highland Park, New Jersey during his graduate studies at Rutgers University.

Trivia
Rucker is a direct descendant of the philosopher Georg Hegel.

Bibliography

Novels
The Ware Tetralogy
Software (1982)
Wetware (1988)
Freeware (1997)
Realware (2000)

Transreal Trilogy
The Secret of Life (1985)
White Light (1980)
Saucer Wisdom (1999) novel marketed as non-fiction

Transreal novels
Spacetime Donuts (1981)
The Sex Sphere (1983)
Master of Space and Time (1984)
The Hollow Earth (1990)
The Hacker and the Ants (1994) (Revised 'Version 2.0' 2003)
Spaceland (2002)
Frek and the Elixir (2004)
Mathematicians in Love (2006)
Jim and the Flims (2011)
The Big Aha (2013)
All the Visions (1991), memoir/novel

Other novels
As Above, So Below: A Novel of Peter Bruegel (2002)
Postsingular (2007)
Hylozoic  (sequel to Postsingular, May 2009)
Turing and Burroughs (2012)
Return to the Hollow Earth (2018)
Million Mile Road Trip (2019)
Juicy Ghosts (2021)

Short fiction 
Collections
The Fifty-Seventh Franz Kafka (1983)
Transreal!, includes poetry and non-fiction essays (1991)
Gnarl! (2000), complete short stories
Mad Professor (2006)
Surfing the Gnarl (2012), includes an essay and interview with the author
Complete Stories (2012)
Transreal Cyberpunk, with Bruce Sterling (2016)

Stories (by date of composition)

Non-fiction
Geometry, Relativity and the Fourth Dimension (1977)
Infinity and the Mind (1982)
The Fourth Dimension: Toward a Geometry of Higher Reality (1984)
Mind Tools (1987)
Seek! (1999), collected essays
Software Engineering and Computer Games (2002), textbook
The Lifebox, the Seashell, and the Soul: What Gnarly Computation Taught Me About Ultimate Reality, the Meaning of Life, and How to Be Happy (Thunder's Mouth Press, 2005)
Nested Scrolls - autobiography (2011)
Collected Essays (2012)
How to Make an Ebook (2012)
Better Worlds (2013), art book of Rucker's paintings
Journals 1990–2014 (2015)

As editor
Speculations on the Fourth Dimension: Selected Writings of Charles H. Hinton, Dover (1980), 
Mathenauts: Tales of Mathematical Wonder, Arbor House (1987)
Semiotext(e) SF, Autonomedia (1989)

Critical studies and reviews of Rucker's work
The big aha
 
Turing and Burroughs

Filmography
 As actor-speaker in Manual of Evasion LX94, a 1994 film by Edgar Pêra

Explanatory notes

References

External links

 Rudy Rucker Portal
 Rudy Rucker Books
 
 

1946 births
20th-century American male writers
20th-century American non-fiction writers
20th-century American novelists
21st-century American male writers
21st-century American non-fiction writers
21st-century American novelists
American male non-fiction writers
American male novelists
American people of German descent
American science fiction writers
American technology writers
Asimov's Science Fiction people
Cellular automatists
Cyberpunk writers
Living people
Novelists from Kentucky
Novelists from New York (state)
People from Highland Park, New Jersey
People from Los Gatos, California
Rutgers University alumni
San Jose State University faculty
State University of New York at Geneseo faculty
Swarthmore College alumni
Wired (magazine) people
Writers from California
Writers from Louisville, Kentucky